Dziedina ([d͡ʑeˈd͡ʑina]) means a field of study, discipline or geographic domain in Polish and may refer to
Julian Dziedzina (1930–2007), a Polish film critic and director
Nowa Dziedzina, a village in the administrative district in Poland
Stara Dziedzina, a village in Poland